Bellevue Township may refer to the following places in the United States:

 Bellevue Township, Jackson County, Iowa
 Bellevue Township, Eaton County, Michigan
 Bellevue Township, Morrison County, Minnesota

Township name disambiguation pages